The first season of Supermodel aired on the Swiss television channel 3+ from November to December 2007. The season was presented by Swiss former model, business woman and manager Nadja Schildknecht. The judging panel comprised Schildknecht, show and event producer and choreographer Yannick Aellen and celebrity hairstylist Mike Karg. From 1000 applicants, 100 candidates were invited to participate in the auditions, with 15 being selected as part of the final cast. A sixteenth finalist, 25-year-old Sabine, entered the competition in the fourth episode, having originally qualified for the finals in the first round but been unable to participate in the first two weeks due to illness.

The majority of the competition was filmed in Switzerland, mainly in Zürich. Parts of the season were filmed in Bangkok, Paris, London and New York City. The winner of the competition was 21-year-old Nathalie Güdel from Hünibach.

Episodes

Episode 1: Das Casting
Original airdate: 6 November 2007

 Guest judge(s): Sabine Diethelm

Episode 2: Lofteinzug/Die ersten Shootings
Original airdate: 13 November 2007

 Quit: Rrezearta & Jessica
 Challenge winner(s): Tanya Krummenacher
 Eliminated: Mirjana, Milica & Alexandra
 Guest judge(s): Florian Beck

Episode 3: Ab nach Fernost
Original airdate: 20 November 2007

 Challenge winner(s): Gorana Markovic & Tanya Krummenacher
 Eliminated: Anastasiya
 Bottom three: Arina Mironkina, Erika & Noemi
 Eliminated: Noemi
 Featured photographer(s): James Muñoz, Philipp Müller
 Special guest(s): Take That & Charles Allen
 Guest judge(s): Philipp Müller

Episode 4: Emotion Pur
Original airdate: 27 November 2007

 Entered: Sabine
 Challenge winner(s): Sabine
 Eliminated: Erika
 Bottom three: Ivana Vujcic, Nathalie Güdel & Sabine
 Eliminated: Sabine
 Featured photographer(s): Pier Luigi Macor
 Special guest(s): Lisa Feldmann & Tommy Hilfiger
 Guest judge(s): Franziska Knuppe

Episode 5: Vive la France
Original airdate: 4 December 2007

 Challenge winner(s): Eliane Heutschi
 Eliminated: Aleksandra
 Bottom three: Arina Mironkina, Ivana Vujcic & Gorana Markovic
 Eliminated: Ivana Vujcic
 Featured photographer(s): Patrizio Di Renzo & Philipp Müller
 Special guest(s): Bea Petri
 Guest judge(s): Patrizio di Renzo & Ursula Knecht

Episode 6: Der letzte Schritt
Original airdate: 11 December 2007

 Challenge winner(s): Nathalie Güdel & Tanya Krummenacher
 Eliminated: Tanya Krummenacher
 Bottom three: Arina Mironkina, Eliane Heutschi & Nathalie Güdel
 Eliminated: Arina Mironkina
 Featured photographer(s): Diana Scheunemann
 Special guest(s): Sebastian "Baschi" Bürgin, Carl Hirschmann & Dominik Benigna
 Guest judge(s): Marcus Schenkenberg

Episode 7: Finale
Original airdate: 18 December 2007

 Final three: Eliane Heutschi, Gorana Markovic & Nathalie Güdel 
 Eliminated: Eliane Heutschi
 Final two: Gorana Markovic & Nathalie Güdel
 Supermodel: Nathalie Güdel
 Featured photographer(s): Lozza, Joshua Jordan & James Muñoz
 Special guest(s): Marcus Schenkenberg, Nadine Strittmatter
 Guest judge(s): Sabine Diethelm

Episode 8: Best Of
Original airdate: 25 December 2007

This was the recap episode.

Contestants

(ages stated are at start of contest)

Summaries

Call-out order

 The contestant quit the competition
 The contestant was eliminated
 The contestant won the competition

 Jessica and Rrezearta quit the competition at the beginning of episode 2.
 Sabine entered the competition in episode 4 and was eliminated in the same episode.

Photo shoot guide
 Episode 2 photo shoot: "Bikini in snow"
 Episode 3 photo shoot: "Maestrani couple shot" & "Bikini on the beach"
 Episode 4 photo shoot: "tears"
 Episode 5 photo shoot: "Haute Couture"
 Episode 6 photo shoot: "Uncle Ben's"
 Episode 7 photo shoot: "Featuring Marcus Schenkenberg"

References

External links

2007 Swiss television seasons